Margaret Gardner (8 September 1844 – 19 June 1929) was a New Zealand assisted immigrant, domestic servant, farmer and flour mill owner. She was born in Newmains, Lanarkshire, Scotland in 1844. She emigrated on the Sebastopol to Lyttelton in 1863. She died on 19 June 1929.

References

1844 births
1929 deaths
New Zealand farmers
New Zealand women farmers
Scottish emigrants to New Zealand
19th-century New Zealand people